The D class of 1876 was the first example of American-built locomotives to be used on Victorian Railways, and among the first such engines to operate in Australia. 

Both examples were scrapped.

References

Specific

External links 
 
 

4-4-0 locomotives
D class 1876
Railway locomotives introduced in 1876
Broad gauge locomotives in Australia
Scrapped locomotives
Rogers locomotives
Railway locomotives introduced in 1877
Passenger locomotives